The Extra is a 2005 Australian film starring Irish comedian Jimeoin.

At the ARIA Music Awards of 2005 the soundtrack was nominated for Best Original Soundtrack, Cast or Show Album.

Plot
Jimeoin, in the title role, plays a man obsessed with becoming famous. He is passionate about being a celebrity, but unfortunately he just isn't very talented. After trying to secure roles in myriad productions he finally finds employment as an extra, and what follows is his misadventures as he becomes involved with shady business men, producers and mobsters, all of whom are fixated with show business.

Production
Jimeoin was interested in writing the film because he wanted to explore the nature of fame.

He says it took five years to write the script.
I work on them really slowly. I do a lot of stand-up, so time's at a minimum, and then, after two years I looked at it and thought it was the wrong thing I wanted to do - so I started again, and got it done within a year and a half after that. I then noticed I had two stories mixed into one, so I had to pick one story over the other - that's probably why it took five years, I had to realise that... I wanted the second film to have a broader appeal, then I could get more money to make it - so it would be a better looking picture. It's not a film about films - there's not a lot of film jokes in it. I'm really hoping people discover it.

Jimeon was integral to the casting progress.
Katherine Slattery, I hadn't met before, and I remember she came to the audition process and just nailed it. Everyone else [in the film] I knew pretty well, but I still had them audition for it. That's the only way you know whether they're going to work as their characters. I actually removed things from the script after the audition - because they didn't work.
It was the first movie shot at Melbourne's Docklands Studios.

Reaction

Box office
The Extra grossed $749,113 at the box office in Australia.

Overseas Release
While this film was considered a box office flop in Australia, in 2007 it became the first Australian film to receive a general release in the People's Republic of China since Crocodile Dundee. The film was picked up by a Chinese distributor following a series of film festivals organised in the country by the Department of Foreign Affairs and Trade in 2006. The Chinese distributor contacted the producers and brokered the deal.

"People in China are attracted to the dream of fame and celebrity like everyone else The Extra treats the aspiration in a way Chinese audiences will respond to", said a spokesman for the distributor. "It is a cleverly structured film with some wonderful performances and a lovely balance of drama and humour".

"When you put a lot of work into something and it doesn't do very well it can be disheartening," said Jimeoin. "There are some many films in the world and when you release an Australian film you're up against all of them. The Extra is a simple film and it was released with no fuss, we paid for that but it shows every cloud has a silver lining".

See also
Cinema of Australia

References

External links
The Extra at the national Film and Sound Archive
 
Trailer for film at YouTube
Review of film at At the Movies
Review of film at The Age
Review of film at Sydney Morning Herald
Review of film at MC Reviews

APRA Award winners
2005 films
Australian romantic comedy films
2005 romantic comedy films
Films shot in Melbourne
Films scored by Roger Mason (musician)
2000s English-language films
Films directed by Kevin Carlin